Yeni Qaradolaq (also, Yenikaradolak) is a village and municipality in the Aghjabadi Rayon of Azerbaijan.  It has a population of 2,282.

References 

Populated places in Aghjabadi District